, released in North America as Reign: The Conqueror and in Europe as Alexander the Great, is a Korean-Japanese anime first released in 1999. A re-imagination of the life of Alexander the Great based on the novel of the same name by Hiroshi Aramata, the series was produced by an international crew that drew from the resources of the worldwide animation community. Character designs and original designs for the show were conceived by Peter Chung (known for Æon Flux) while the show was written by Sadayuki Murai and directed by Yoshinori Kanemori. Most of the production work was handled by Korean animators. 

In the original attempt at American distribution, the producers created a dub under the direction of veteran voice director Jack Fletcher. However, when the anime was picked up by Tokyopop and prepared for its 2003 release as Reign: The Conqueror, another dub was created. Still, Tokyopop retained the rights to the first four episodes of the series containing Fletcher's original dub, and used them for the first four episodes of the American release. It used the second dub for the remaining episodes. Only John DeMita would return to voice in the series under the alias Will Barrett, and would also take over the role of Alexander from Andrew Philpot.

There is also a theatrical version of Reign: The Conqueror, known as Alexander: The Movie in North America, which consists almost entirely of recut footage from the series, with the only new content being short opening and closing scenes. The movie covers the first ten episodes of the anime, ending with Alexander's victory over Darius and the Persian army.

Plot

Alexander is son of Philip II, king of Macedonia and Olympias, a snake witch. Desiring to attain 'speed', Alexander heads to the woods with allies Philotas and Hephaestion, where he tames a wild man-eating horse. There he meets and befriends Cleitus and Ptolemy I Soter, recruiting them to join his cavalry. Macedonia heads to war with Athens, led by King Philip and his top advisers, Attalus, Parmenion (father of Philotas) and Antipater. Philip becomes concerned with Alexander's absence, but Alexander and his cavalry arrive at the last moment, exploiting a break in the Athenian lines and leading Macedonia to victory. After their defeat, Athens ambassadors head to Persia, where they hope to align with new king Darius III of Persia. Alexander and his friends however sneak in as Athens slaves then kill the guards, causing Persia to think that Athens is betraying them.  While Ptolemy is caught and suspended in the air, Alexander is able to save him from execution at the last minute by releasing all the horses in the city from their stables. While in Persia Alexander also meets a woman named Roxanne.

Attalus tricks Philip into thinking that Olympias and Alexander are trying to betray him. Philip banishes Olympias and marries Attalus's daughter Eurydice, who gives birth to a son that Philip desires to become king instead of Alexander. Philip holds a great ceremony to present his new prince to the masses and also constructs a huge golden statue of himself, declaring himself a God. During the ceremony however the statue crumbles and a guard hypnotized by Olympias assassinates Philip.

Following Philip's death Alexander ascends to King and Attalus is executed. Athens plots to fight back against Macedonia, doubting Alexander's strength, but relents once Macedonia defeats Thebes in battle.  Alexander places severe demands on Athens but relents on most of them after meeting with the philosopher Diogenes of Sinope. Alexander next plots an attack on Persia and starts leading his troops there. Around this time Parmenion reveals to Philotas a secret about Alexander, that prior to his birth Olympias proclaimed that he would destroy the world. In addition, Aristotle sends his niece, Cassandra, to join Alexander's cavalry. Macedonia's forces continue to head through Persia's territories with multiple victories. Along the way Alexander recruits the doctor Phillipas to join him after undoing 'Gordian's Knot' which has been said can only be undone by the King. In their next battle with Persia, Macedonia's troops are hopelessly outnumbered by Persia's which are 10 times that of Macedonia's, but Darius tells his forces to retreat when members of the Pythagorean Cult intervene. During the battle Philotas falls off his horse and has a vision of Olympias summoning demons.

While in Egypt Alexander meets Dinocrates, a member of his army who tells him of the great city he'd prefer to create there, Alexandria. Alexander has a vision of himself being in Alexandria 100 years after his death where he visits the place where he was entombed by Ptolemy. Before leaving Egypt Alexander and his men visit the Temple of Ammon where they are told that Alexander will be killed by the one he trusts the most.  Ptolemy witnesses a separate prophecy, that he will become Great King of the World. Plotting with Persia, Pythagorean cult members make another attempt on Alexander's life but he is able to fight them off. Darius leads Persia's armies against Macedonia's.  Aristotle meanwhile meets with Diogenes, requesting the Plato-Hedron, the device which contains the knowledge of the entire world. Diogenes claims however that he tossed it aside. The two watch as the battle continues.  The Macedonian army gains new strength when there is an eclipse of the moon, and the Plato-Hedron appears and ascends to the heavens. As the battle nears its conclusion, Alexander kills Darius, defeating the Persians once and for all.

With Persia now part of his empire, Alexander recruits Satibarzanes, Darius's former adviser and Satrap, to become a top adviser of his. The Macedonian army becomes concerned that Alexander wants to continue heading east rather than return to Macedonia. Philotas dismisses their complaints but doesn't tell Alexander. Aristotle is also concerned with Alexander's actions and tells Cassandra that she will have to kill him should he continue to push eastward. Phillipas, secretly a member of the Pythagorean cult, plots with them to kill Alexander during his wedding to Roxanne through the use of a dancer possessing poison. During the battle she poisons Alexander but is killed before finishing him off. Satibarzanes frames Parmenion and Philotas for treason. Parmenion is killed by the plotters and Philotas is tied up and stoned to death. When Alexander arrives during the stoning, Philotas requests he let him die so as to not show weakness to the Persians. Phillipas, who treats Alexander, has the opportunity to poison Alexander but instead reveals the truth to him and provides Alexander the means to heal himself, then kills himself with the poison intended for Alexander.

After executing Satibarzanes and the other Persian traitors, Alexander leads his forces towards India. Aristotle provides Cassandra with a parchment that she is instructed to read when they reach India. They reach India where they see a large number of horse-like men known as the Brahman priests. Cleitus, becoming increasingly suspicious of Alexander, questions his motives. At this moment, the Brahman suddenly attack, interrupting them. As Alexander and Cleitus fend them off, Cassandra reads the parchment, putting her under a spell from Aristotle to kill Alexander. When she lunges towards him, Cleitus steps in the way and takes the fatal wound himself.

Alexander and the others continue through India, where they encounter a massive army made up of all the soldiers they have killed over the years. During the battle, Hephaestian is killed when Alexander fights the ghost of Darius. Alexander rides on into a column of light and faces off against King Porus, who takes on Alexander's appearance. Stating that the world tells him to destroy himself, Alexander defeats his doppelganger in combat. He then encounters Pythagoras at the end of the world, but Pythagoras has no interest in stopping Alexander from destroying the world. He echoes Diogenes' words to Alexander that by destroying the world, Alexander will be creating it anew. Alexander seemingly embraces his destiny as destroyer of the world, but the world does not end: instead, the dark skies clear and Alexander emerges from a pillar of light facing west. He decrees that destiny now points him that way, and embarks for Macedonia.

After Alexander and his army return to Macedonia, Aristotle receives a letter from Cassandra informing him that she has chosen to stay with Alexander of her own will. Later, a handmaiden attempts to find Alexander to tell him that Roxanne is pregnant. Elsewhere, Alexander is asked to get out of the light by a child drawing geometric shapes and writing formulas on the ground. Motivated by his own prophecy, Ptolemy attempts to stab Alexander, but Alexander prevents him. He then lets Ptolemy escape, stating that Ptolemy's prophecy is unchanged. Alexander turns back to the child's work, and Cassandra asks what he is looking at. Alexander replies that he is witnessing the world he destroyed being reborn.

At this moment, a soldier appears and announces that they are ready to depart for Arabia. As Alexander walks off, it is revealed that the child's name is Euclid, and he pulls out a small version of the Platohedron. This may imply that the destruction of the world was metaphysical in nature, and that the new world of Euclid and Ptolemy I Soter has replaced the old world of Aristotle and Plato. The final scene depicts Euclid's Platohedron resting on the ground next to his diagrams, catching the sun's dying rays. This fades into a stark image of Alexander atop his horse, set against the sun and a crimson sky.

Cast

References

External links

 Alexander (Arekusandaa Senki - Yoshinori Kanemori, Hiroshi Aramata, 1999) (Anime Mundi), detailed production information

1996 Japanese novels
1999 anime television series debuts
Action anime and manga
Japanese biographical films
Cultural depictions of Alexander the Great
Cultural depictions of Diogenes
Cultural depictions of Aristotle
Cultural depictions of Pythagoras
Films set in ancient Egypt
Films set in ancient Greece
Films set in ancient India
Films set in ancient Persia
Films about Alexander the Great
Films set in the 4th century BC
Kadokawa Dwango franchises
Light novels
Madhouse (company)
Tokyopop titles
Wowow original programming